The 1976 Rothmans Canadian Open was a tennis tournament played on outdoor clay courts at the National Tennis Centre in Toronto in Canada that was part of the 1976 Commercial Union Assurance Grand Prix and of the 1976 WTA Tour. The tournament was held from August 16 through August 22, 1976.

Finals

Men's singles
 Guillermo Vilas defeated  Wojciech Fibak 6–4, 7–6, 6–2
 It was Vilas' 4th title of the year and the 25th of his career.

Women's singles
 Mima Jaušovec defeated  Lesley Hunt 6–2, 6–0
 It was Jaušovec's 2nd title of the year and the 2nd of her career.

Men's doubles
 Bob Hewitt /  Raúl Ramírez defeated  Juan Gisbert Sr. /  Manuel Orantes 6–2, 6–1
 It was Hewitt's 3rd title of the year and the 27th of his career. It was Ramírez's 15th title of the year and the 42nd of his career.

Women's doubles
 Cynthia Doerner /  Janet Newberry defeated   /   by walkover
 It was Doerner's 1st title of the year and the 1st of her career. It was Newberry's 1st title of the year and the 1st of her career.

References

External links
 
 Association of Tennis Professionals (ATP) tournament profile
 Women's Tennis Association (WTA) tournament profile

Rothmans Canadian Open
Canadian Open (tennis)
Rothmans Canadian Open
Rothmans Canadian Open
Rothmans Canadian Open